GG Tauri, often abbreviated as GG Tau, is a quintuple star system in the constellation Taurus. At a distance of about 450 light years (140 parsecs) away, it is located within the Taurus-Auriga Star Forming Region. The system comprises three stars orbiting each other in a hierarchical triple system, known as GG Tauri A, and another binary star system more distant from the central system, known as GG Tauri B.

The system is unusual because it contains two distinct circumstellar disks: one surrounding the entirety of GG Tauri A, and another surrounding the brightest star of GG Tauri A. Its large size and close distance make it ideal to study how exoplanets form within multiple star systems.

Properties

GG Tauri consists of five stars, which are T Tauri stars – a class of variable stars that show irregular changes in brightness. These stars are extremely young and more luminous than their main sequence counterparts, because they have not condensed into the normal size yet. The four components of GG Tauri stars are relatively cool K-type or M-type stars, with these spectral types: K7 for GG Tauri Aa, M0.5 for GG Tauri Ab, M5 for GG Tauri Ba, and M7 for GG Tauri Bb; the age of the system is estimated to be 1.5 million years.

At , GG Tauri Bb has a substellar mass and is a brown dwarf. Orbital motion has been detected in the central system (Aa and Ab), but not in the outer pair Ba and Bb (as its orbital period is too long).

A preliminary orbit for GG Tauri Aa and Ab has been calculated, but is not very well constrained. The orbit is moderately eccentric; Some studies have determined that their orbit has a semimajor axis of about 34 au and is misaligned to the circumbinary disk by about 25 degrees. However, other studies have found the orbit to be coplanar to the circumbinary disk, with a larger semimajor axis of about 60 au.

Interferometric techniques have been used to observe GG Tauri Ab, the lower-mass component of the central system. GG Tauri Ab was found to be a binary star system comprising two red dwarfs (Ab1 = M2V, Ab2 = M3V), with a separation of about 4.5 AU. Its orbital period is currently estimated to be around 16 years. This would explain why the GG Tauri Ab's spectrum suggests an unusually low-mass star instead of the higher mass that was measured.

Because of interactions with GG Tauri A, the outer pair GG Tauri Ba and Bb are not very stable. The internal orbit of GG Tauri Ba and Bb must be retrograde relative to its whole orbit around GG Tauri A, in order to be stable.

Circumstellar disks

T Tauri stars are usually surrounded by circumstellar disks of gas and dust. These disks coalesce into protoplanets and then into planets.

The subsystem GG Tauri A has a large, circumbinary (technically circumtrinary) disk. Within the disk, GG Tauri Aa also has a disk, and furthermore, at least one of the Ab stars must have a disk as well. The latter is inferred from the presence of a "gap" in the largest disk, detected at the three-o'clock position, at a position angle of about 268°. First seen in 2002, it is interpreted as a shadow because it does not rotate with the disk. Interstellar material blocks the light from part of the disk, causing this shadow. The Aa and Ab rings are coplanar to each other.

Mass is currently accreting from the inner disks into the stars themselves. Because the disks have not been consumed yet, the larger, circumbinary disk must be supplying mass into the smaller disks. Several lines of evidence point to this. Firstly, a search for diatomic hydrogen gas (H2) could be found up to 100 AU away from the center of the system, but significant emission was also detected 30 au away. This emission was detected where a previous survey found gas streaming from the outer disk to the inner disk, so it was assumed that the emission resulted from mass falling from the inner disk to the outer disk. Observations taken in 2014 showed similar results. Secondly, near-infrared polarimetry of the area showed the same structure connecting the inner and outer disks. The stars of GG Tauri A are closer to the ring on the northern side (where the streamer is) than the southern side. Finally, although there is not much gas falling into the inner disks, the accretion rate of gas has been measured to be ~ yr−1 which is at least the rate of accretion from the inner disks to the stars themselves. Therefore, the outer disk provides enough mass to replenish the inner disks.

Possible protoplanets
At the edge of the outer disk, there is a "hot spot" with additional gas, and at a higher temperature of about 40 K. There are also spiral-shaped formations within the disk. At the center of this "hot spot" may be a protoplanet termed GG Tauri Ac, which is still accreting mass. This would explain the higher gas density and temperature, as well as the spiral formations. If it exists, it would likely be about the mass of Neptune or smaller, given that it has not cleared out a gap at its location. Other planets could explain other spiral features within the disk.

Chemistry
The chemistry of circumstellar disks is important for understanding planetary formation. The inner disk, like other protoplanetary disks, is rich in simple molecules containing elements such as carbon and sulfur. In 2018, hydrogen sulfide was reported, and in 2021, thioxoethenylidene (CCS) was reported to exist within the disk. Both are the first instances of those species known in a protoplanetary disk. The chemical mechanisms related to their formation are not very well understood.

See also
HL Tauri, a T Tauri star with a protoplanetary disk
BD−22 5866, a quadruple star system with relatively low mass
Taurus (Chinese astronomy)

References

Tauri, GG
Taurus (constellation)
T Tauri stars
K-type main-sequence stars
M-type main-sequence stars
Circumstellar disks
5